Charles Gayle (born February 28, 1939) is an American free jazz musician. Initially known as a saxophonist who came to prominence in the 1990s after decades of obscurity, Gayle also performs as pianist, bass clarinetist, bassist, and percussionist.

Biography
Charles Gayle was born in Buffalo, New York. Some of his history has been unclear due to his reluctance to talk about his life in interviews. He briefly taught music at the University at Buffalo before relocating to New York City during the early 1970s.

Gayle was homeless for approximately twenty years, playing saxophone on street corners and subway platforms around New York City. He has described making a conscious decision to become homeless: "I had to shed my history, my life, everything had to stop right there, and if you live through this, good, and if you don't, you don't. I can't do the rent, the odd jobs, the little rooms, scratchin', and all that, no!" At the same time, this allowed Gayle to devote most of his time to playing music, although he often earned less than US$3 a day from busking:
First of all, I played to play because I need to play. Second of all, the money, a dollar meant a lot to me at that time. Playing out there is obviously different than playing on a stage but that is so rich out there. It's such a whole 'nother world of playin'. I mean I used to walk from Times Square, for instance, all the way to Wall Street playin'. I could walk back and never stop playing. I didn't think about it as anything other than what it was. These were people and I wasn't overly concerned with what they thought. I was playing, I had to play. Also I had to eat some way and I'm not the type to put my hand out. I'd stand there playing with a coffee cup sometime and people would put money in my coffee [Laughs] and you don't get that on the stage. That's beautiful.
When Gayle first set out on the streets, he did not imagine he would remain homeless as long as he did, although he estimates that this period lasted closer to fifteen years than twenty.

In 1988, he gained fame through a trio of albums recorded in one week and released by Swedish label, Silkheart Records. Since then he has become a major figure in free jazz, recording for labels including Black Saint, Knitting Factory Records, FMP, and Clean Feed. He has also taught music at Bennington College.

Gayle's music is spiritual, and heavily inspired by the Old and New Testaments. Gayle explains, "I want the people to enjoy the music and if it, in anyway can suggest something about the Lord, for their benefit, that would be first in my mind." He has explicitly dedicated several albums to God. His childhood was influenced by religion, and his musical roots trace to black gospel music.  He has performed and recorded with Cecil Taylor, William Parker, and Rashied Ali. Gayle's most celebrated work to date is the album Touchin' on Trane (FMP) with Parker and Ali, which received the "Crown" accolade from the Penguin Guide to Jazz.

Though he established his reputation primarily as a tenor saxophonist, he has increasingly turned to other instruments, notably the piano (which was, in fact, his original instrument) and alto saxophone. More controversially, he has sometimes included lengthy spoken-word addresses to the audience in his concerts touching on his political and religious beliefs: "I understand that when you start speaking about faith or religion, they want you to keep it in a box, but I'm not going to do that. Not because I'm taking advantage of being a musician, I'm the same everywhere, and people have to understand that." Gayle sometimes performs as a mime, "Streets the Clown." "Streets means to me, first, a freedom from Charles. I'm not good at being the center of attention…. It's a liberation from Charles, even though it's me on the stage, it's a different person."

In 2001, Gayle recorded an album entitled Jazz Solo Piano. It consisted mostly of straightforward jazz standards, and is a response to critics who charge that free jazz musicians cannot play bebop. In 2006, Gayle followed up with a second album of solo piano, this time featuring original material, entitled Time Zones.

Charles Gayle appears in the 1985 Jazz documentary, "Rising Tones Cross", directed by Ebba Jahn. He is seen playing with Rashied Ali, Marilyn Crispell, and many others, and is interviewed.

Discography

As leader 
 Always Born (Silkheart, 1988)
 Homeless (Silkheart, 1989)
 Spirits Before (Silkheart, 1988)
 Repent (Knitting Factory, 1992)
 More Live at the Knitting Factory (Knitting Factory, 1993)
 Touchin' on Trane (FMP, 1993)
 Consecration (Black Saint, 1993)
 Raining Fire (Silkheart, 1993)
 Translations (Silkheart, 1993)
 Live at Disobey (Blast First, 1994)
 Kingdom Come (Knitting Factory, 1994)
 Unto I Am (Victo, 1995)
 Testaments (Knitting Factory, 1995)
 Delivered (2.13.61, 1997)
 Berlin Movement from Future Years (FMP, 1997)
 Solo in Japan (PSF, 1997)
 Daily Bread (Black Saint, 1998)
 Ancient of Days (Knitting Factory, 1999)
 Abiding Variations (FMP, 1999)
 Jazz Solo Piano (Knitting Factory, 2001)
 Precious Soul (FMP, 2001)
 No Bills (Long Arms, 2005)
 Shout! (Clean Feed, 2005)
 Time Zones (Tompkins Square, 2006)
 Live at Glenn Miller Cafe (Ayler, 2006)
 Consider the Lilies (Clean Feed, 2006)
 Blue Shadows (Silkheart, 2007)
 Forgiveness (Not Two, 2008)
 Our Souls: Live in Vilnius (NoBusiness, 2010)
 Streets (Northern Spy, 2012)
 Look Up (ESP Disk, 2012)
 Christ Everlasting (For Tune, 2015)
 Solar System (For Tune, 2017)
 Seasons Changing (Otoroku 2019)
 The Alto Sessions (El Negocito, 2019)

As sideman
 Sunny Murray, Illuminators (Audible Hiss, 1996)
 William Parker, Requiem (Splasc(H), 2006)
 Henry Rollins, Everything (2.13.61, 1996)
 Henry Rollins, Weighting (2.13.61, 2003)
 Sirone and Billy Bang, Configuration (Silkheart, 2005)
 Cecil Taylor, Always a Pleasure (FMP, 1996)

References

External links 
The FMP releases
Charles Gayle interview by Howard Mandel for The Wire

1939 births
Living people
21st-century American male musicians
21st-century clarinetists
21st-century American saxophonists
African-American saxophonists
American jazz saxophonists
American male jazz musicians
American male saxophonists
Avant-garde jazz musicians
Bass clarinetists
Blast First artists
Homeless people
FMP/Free Music Production artists
Northern Spy Records artists
Silkheart Records artists
21st-century African-American musicians
20th-century African-American people
NoBusiness Records artists